Humanary Stew: A Tribute to Alice Cooper is a 1999 tribute album to American rock musician Alice Cooper.

Track listing 
 "Under My Wheels"
 Joe Elliott - Vocals
 Phil Collen - Lead guitar
 Bob Kulick - Rhythm guitar
 Chuck Wright - Bass
 Clarence Clemons - Saxophone
 Pat Torpey - Drums
 "School’s Out"
 Dave Mustaine - Vocals
 Marty Friedman - Lead guitar
 Bob Kulick - Rhythm guitar
 Bob Daisley - Bass
 Paul Taylor - Keyboards
 Eric Singer - Drums
 "No More Mr. Nice Guy"
 Roger Daltrey - Vocals
 Slash - Lead guitar
 Bob Kulick - Rhythm guitar
 Mike Inez - Bass
 Carmine Appice - Drums
 "Welcome to My Nightmare"
 Ronnie James Dio - Vocals
 Steve Lukather - Lead guitar
 Bob Kulick - Rhythm guitar
 Phil Soussan - Bass
 Paul Taylor - Keyboards
 Randy Castillo - Drums
 "Cold Ethyl"
 Vince Neil - Vocals
 Mick Mars - Lead guitar
 Bob Kulick - Rhythm guitar
 Billy Sheehan - Bass
 Simon Phillips - Drums
 "Black Widow"
 Bruce Dickinson - Vocals
 Adrian Smith - Lead guitar
 Bob Kulick - Rhythm guitar
 Tony Franklin - Bass
 Tommy Aldridge - Drums
 "Go To Hell"
 Dee Snider - Vocals
 Zakk Wylde - Lead guitar
 Bob Kulick - Rhythm guitar
 Rudy Sarzo - Bass
 Paul Taylor - Keyboards
 Frankie Banali - Drums
 "Billion Dollar Babies"
 Phil Lewis - Vocals
 George Lynch - Lead guitar
 Bob Kulick - Rhythm guitar
 Stu Hamm - Bass
 Derek Sherinian - Keyboards
 Vinnie Colaiuta- Drums
 "Only Women Bleed"
 Glenn Hughes - Vocals
 Paul Gilbert - Lead guitar
 Bob Kulick - Rhythm guitar
 Michael Porcaro - Bass
 Paul Taylor - Keyboards
 Stephen Ferrone - Drums
 "I'm Eighteen"
 Don Dokken - Vocals
 John Norum - Lead guitar
 Bob Kulick - Rhythm guitar
 Tim Bogert - Bass
 Gregg Bissonette - Drums
 "Elected"
 Steve Jones - Vocals
 Billy Duffy - Guitar
 Duff McKagan - Bass, Vocals
 Matt Sorum - Drums

Trivia 
Dave Mustaine teamed up with then Megadeth's guitarrist Marty Friedman (along other musicians) to record the "School’s Out" cover, during the band's Risk era. Megadeth previously covered another Alice Cooper song ("No More Mr. Nice Guy") for the soundtrack of Wes Craven's film Shocker, ten years before, in 1989.

References

Tribute albums
1999 compilation albums
Alice Cooper